Mohammed Seddik Benyahia or Ben Yahia (January 30, 1932 – May 3, 1982) was an Algerian politician and a militant nationalist during the war in Algeria. After independence he was Minister of Information (1967–1971), Higher Education (1971–1977), Finance (1977–1979), and Foreign Affairs (1979–1982).

Early life
He was born on January 30, 1932, in Jijel. During the Algerian war, he took an active part in the struggle for independence of his country. He was secretary general of the presidency of the provisional government of the Republic of Algeria (GPRA) and a member of the Algerian delegation in negotiations with the French government in Evian in 1962. He was responsible for chairing the meeting of CNRA in Tripoli (Libya) in 1962. After the independence of his country, he held the post of ambassador to Moscow and London. He led the Algerian team that brokered the Algiers Accords.

Ministries he held
 Minister of Information from 1967 to 1971, When he organized the first Pan-African Festival in 1968.
 Minister of Higher Education and Scientific Research from 1971 to 1977.
 Minister of Finance from 1977 to 1979.
 Minister of Foreign Affairs from 1979 till his death.

Death
On 3 May 1982, his plane was shot down on the Iran-Turkey border during his mediation mission in the Iran–Iraq War. Both Iran and Iraq rejected responsibility.

References

Further reading
Algerian newspaper El Watan May 26, 2012 "30 years ago, The Tragic death of Seddik Benyahia and his companions".

1932 births
1982 deaths
People from Jijel
National Liberation Front (Algeria) politicians
Finance ministers of Algeria
Government ministers of Algeria
Victims of aviation accidents or incidents in Iran
Victims of aviation accidents or incidents in 1982
Algerian expatriates in the United Kingdom
Foreign ministers of Algeria
Ambassadors of Algeria to the United Kingdom
Ambassadors of Algeria to the Soviet Union
Victims of aircraft shootdowns